Something and anything are concepts of existence in ontology, contrasting with the concept of nothing. Both are used to describe the understanding that what exists is not nothing without needing to address the existence of everything. The philosopher, David Lewis, has pointed out that these are necessarily vague terms, asserting that "ontological assertions of common sense are correct if the quantifiers—such words as "something" and "anything"—are restricted roughly to ordinary or familiar things."

The idea that "something" is the opposite of "nothing" has existed at least since it was proposed by the Neoplatonist philosopher Porphyry in the 3rd century. One of the most basic questions of both science and philosophy is:  why is there something rather than nothing at all? A question that follows from this is whether it is ever actually possible for there to be nothing at all, or whether there must always be something.

Grammatically, "something and anything are commonly classified as pronouns, although they do not stand for another noun so clearly as does thing itself, a word always classified as a noun".

In predicate logic

In predicate logic, what is described in layman's terms as "something" can more specifically be regarded as existential quantification, that is, the predication of a property or relation to at least one member of the domain. It is a type of quantifier, a logical constant which is interpreted as "there exists," "there is at least one," or "for some." It expresses that a propositional function can be satisfied by at least one member of a domain of discourse. In other terms, it is the predication of a property or relation  to at least one member of the domain. It asserts that a predicate within the scope of an existential quantifier is true of at least one value of a predicate variable.

Nothing and something

Though considered to exclude one another, the concepts of something and nothing can coincide under special circumstances. One example would be when a person says "I am doing nothing"; they are really doing something, because it is physically and mentally impossible to do nothing. At the specific level, nothing can be used as a label describing something. The requirement is that the nothing equates to not changing the outcome. For instance, when hiking up and down a mountain, the trip can be expressed in increments of height. Climbing the mountain, the increments can be described as pluses (as in positive increases) and when descending the increments are described as minuses (negative increases). Yet walking around at the top of a mountain, one does not ascend or descend, and the increments are neither positive nor negative. Nothing in height was added or subtracted when reviewing these specific moments during the mountain climb.

This reality of nothing can only occur as a subset of somethings. In the example above, the somethings can be seen as the mountain and the person climbing the mountain. Next, the nothing can be recognized as a something, but again only as part of the subset of the exercise, since walking around can be referred to as doing something while the exercise adds nor subtracts anything in height.

To set nothing correctly apart from something, one must declare the specific level at which the something and the nothing are articulated. Both are therefore not only declared by their own definition but need to be declared within a larger reality as well. Without declaring the overall setting — and this brings us to the overall level that Gödel already explored — it becomes difficult to declare whether we're talking about a tree or about a forest, particularly where nothing is concerned.

Anything

Often pronounced in a way that indicates evading specifics, anything provides full freedom about the something that is supposedly covered by the word. "Anything goes" indicates maximization of freedom, just like "Do as you please" means there are no restrictions other than the restrictions put in place by oneself.

One can make the statement that anything is a specific word where everything can be seen as a general word. Still, both meanings may readily be understood by everyone, while their definitions will equally contain some aspects of murkiness as to what is included and what is not. First of all, anything does not need to be covered by an actual something, since an act of god or fate, a coincident or an unintended consequence can also be included in the list of anything. Also, the question whether an actual nothing can also be used to take up the place of anything is harder to debate at the abstract level and requires actual input to declare whether this is true or false.  Examples of this position are that not the amount of money, but rather the lack of money can make us rise and shine early from bed to go to work, and that not the abundance of food, but rather hunger and the lack of food make us hunt and till the soil. See also: Much Ado About Nothing.

Singular and plural somethings

Since words are abstracts and are actualized only through the action of understanding, an interesting distinction exists between singular somethings and plural somethings. When describing a single object or describing more than one object in an action of, for instance, breaking something, the verb is conjugated differently. In "The glass was broken" and "The glasses were broken," the verb to be is conjugated differently according to the singular or plural reality described. However, when using a singular word describing multiple items, the verb is (correctly) conjugated as if this were a singular entity: "The collection was destroyed" and not "The collection were destroyed."

The example shows that plural somethings can be presented as singular somethings. Actual somethings can therefore as shown above be hidden under the banner of an abstract something. Some claim to have evidence that a singular something does not occur in actuality at the overall level ever, and that a singular overall truth can only exist correctly at the abstract level in our minds. As such, the concept of something would then also have a direct correlation to the concept of everything just as this exists for the concept of nothing.

References

Further reading
 Bertrand Russell. History of Western Philosophy, Routledge, 1995 .
 Josef Pieper, Berthold Wald, For the Love of Wisdom: Essays on the Nature of Philosophy, Translator: Roger Wasserman, Ignatius Press, 2006 .

External links

Existentialist concepts
Perception
Ontology
Quantity
Concepts in metaphysics